Ponchatoula High School is a public high school in unincorporated Tangipahoa Parish, Louisiana, United States, near Ponchatoula. It is operated by the Tangipahoa Parish School System. Ponchatoula High School is one of the largest high schools in the state of Louisiana by student enrollment.

Athletics
Ponchatoula High athletics competes in the LHSAA. 

The sports teams are known as the Green Wave or Greenwave, after the Tulane Green Wave. Ponchatoula High School's colors are, green and white, instead of Tulane's green and sky blue.

Championships
Football
(1) State Championship: 1940

Boys' basketball
(1) State Championship: 2023

Girls' basketball
(2) State Championship: 2015, 2022

Notable alumni
 Dennis Paul Hebert, Sr., state representative for Tangipahoa Parish, 1972 to 1996
 Robert Henderson, professional football player
 Lindsey Cardinale, Singer and appeared on American Idol
 Tyjae Spears, football player

See also
 Ponchatoula Creek
 USS Ponchatoula (AOG-38)
 USNS Ponchatoula (T-AO-148)

For etymology of the name "Ponchatoula," see Ponchatoula history.

References

Official Website

External links

Public high schools in Louisiana
Schools in Tangipahoa Parish, Louisiana
1913 establishments in Louisiana